Podrečje is a settlement on the left bank of the Kamnik Bistrica River opposite Domžale in the Upper Carniola region of Slovenia.

References

External links
Podrečje on Geopedia

Populated places in the Municipality of Domžale